Motiliproteus sediminis is a bacterium from the genus of Motiliproteus which has been isolated from coastal sediments from the Yellow Sea in China.

References

Oceanospirillales
Bacteria described in 2015